The International Olympic Committee recognises the fastest performances in pool-based swimming events at the Olympic Games. Men's swimming has been part of the official program of the Summer Olympics since the Games' modern inception in 1896; it was not until 1912 that women's events were held. The swimming events at the 1896 Olympic Games were held in a bay in the Aegean Sea with swimmers being required to swim to the shore—Hungarian swimmer Alfréd Hajós won two gold medals that year, saying "My will to live completely overcame my desire to win." The 1900 Summer Olympic Games in Paris had the swimming events take place in the River Seine, and the events at the 1908 Summer Olympics were held in a 100-metre pool surrounded by an athletics track in the White City Stadium in London.

Races are held in four swimming categories: freestyle, backstroke, breaststroke and butterfly, over varying distances and in either individual or relay race events. Medley swimming races are also held, both individually and in relays, in which all four swimming categories are used. In the Swimming at the 2020 Summer Olympics in Tokyo, both men and women competed in eighteen events in the pool. Of the 35 pool-based events, swimmers from the United States hold fourteen records, Australia seven, China four, Hungary three, Great Britain and South Africa two each, and one each to Ukraine, Russian Olympic Committee and Sweden.  Twenty of the current Olympic records were set at the 2020 Summer Olympics, seven in 2016, three in 2012, and five in 2008.


Men's records

♦ denotes a performance that is also a current world record.  Statistics are correct as of the end of the 2020 Olympics and include only those events which are currently recognised by the IOC as Olympic events.

Women's records

♦ denotes a performance that is also a current world record.  Statistics are correct as of the end of the 2020 Olympics and include only those events which are currently recognised by the IOC as Olympic events.

Mixed records
♦ denotes a performance that is also a current world record.  Statistics are correct as of the end of the 2020 Olympics and include only those events which are currently recognised by the IOC as Olympic events.

Footnotes

References
General
 
Specific

Swimming
Swimming at the Summer Olympics
Olympic